Tempting Danger, by Eileen Wilks, is the first full-length release and first novel in the World of the Lupi series. It premiered on October 5, 2004.

Tempting Danger was nominated for the 2004 Romantic Times Reviewers' Choice Award in the category contemporary paranormal romance.

Plot summary
Lily Yu is a San Diego police detective investigating a series of grisly murders that appear to be the work of a werewolf. To hunt down the killer, she must infiltrate the clans. Only one man can help her - a werewolf named Rule Turner, a prince of the lupi, whose charismatic presence disturbs Lily. Rule has his own reasons for helping the investigation - reasons he doesn't want to share with Lily. Logic and honor demand she keep her distance, but the attraction between them is immediate, devastating, and beyond human reason. Now, in a race to fend off evil, Lily finds herself in uncharted territory, tested as never before, and at her back a man who she's not sure she can trust.

Main characters
Lily Yu - a Chinese-American sensitive who works for the Magical Crimes Division of the FBI.
Rule Turner - the Nokolai Heir (or prince, as the press like to dub him). His werewolf clan is located in San Diego, California.
Cynna Weaver - a Finder whose image decorates the cover of Blood Lines. The tattoos are how Cynna works her special brand of magic.
Cullen Seabourne - a recent adoption to Rule's Nokolai werewolf clan. Cullen was clanless for many years. He is also a sorcerer, which is a slightly illegal pastime according to the federal authorities. Eileen describes him as sin incarnate to look at.

Tie in with Only Human
This romantic suspense novel revisits the characters and world introduced in the short story "Only Human" in the Lover Beware anthology, but it covers very different territory. It expands the original story and ends up taking the characters in different directions than the original short story.

References

External links
Eileen Wilks Official website

Werewolf novels
World of the Lupi books
2004 American novels
American horror novels
Novels by Eileen Wilks
Novels set in California
Novels set in San Diego